Asim Medić (born 3 August 1969) is a Bosnian male Paralympic sitting volleyball player. He is part of the Bosnia and Herzegovina national team. He competed at the 2012 Summer Paralympics winning the gold medal. On club level he played for Sdi Spid in 2012.

As a junior, he was involved in the sport of shooting. He won various junior tournaments in former Yugoslavia.

See also
 Bosnia and Herzegovina at the 2012 Summer Paralympics

References

1969 births
Bosnia and Herzegovina men's sitting volleyball players
Volleyball players at the 2000 Summer Paralympics
Volleyball players at the 2004 Summer Paralympics
Volleyball players at the 2008 Summer Paralympics
Volleyball players at the 2012 Summer Paralympics
Volleyball players at the 2016 Summer Paralympics
Paralympic volleyball players of Bosnia and Herzegovina
Medalists at the 2000 Summer Paralympics
Medalists at the 2004 Summer Paralympics
Medalists at the 2008 Summer Paralympics
Medalists at the 2012 Summer Paralympics
Paralympic medalists in volleyball
Paralympic gold medalists for Bosnia and Herzegovina
Paralympic silver medalists for Bosnia and Herzegovina
Place of birth missing (living people)
Living people
Medalists at the 2016 Summer Paralympics